Kal Khongak-e Bozorg (also known as Gel Khongak-e Bozorg, Gol Khongak, Gol Khongak-e Bozorg, and Kal Khongak-e Soflá) is a village in Howmeh Rural District in the Central District of Haftgel County, Khuzestan Province, Iran. At the 2006 census, its population was 89, in 17 families.

References 

Populated places in Haftkel County